Fortanga (Forta) is a river in Russia that flows in Ingushetia and Chechnya. The length of the river is 69 km, the basin area is 526 km².

Geography 
The river originates near the border of Chechnya and Ingushetia on the northern slope of the Tsoreylam (Khaylam) ridge. In the upper course it is called Martanka. Flows to the northeast. The mouth of the river is located near the village of Shaami-Yurt, 7.5 km along the right bank of the Assa River. The length of the river is 69 km.

Settlements standing in the Fortanga river basin: Khay, Khayara, Tsechakhki, Singalhi, Gand-Alie, Phumatiye, Katargashtiye, Mulkaniye, Muzhak, Mashtie, Mazanty, Dekashari, Gozuni, Meredzhi, Dakih, Khaykhara, Gerety, Dalg-Bukh, Dak-Bukh, Egichozh, Egiboss, Dattykh, Belkhara, Gandalbos, Arshty, Izdig, Futtunchie, Akati , Bereshki, Samiogochie, Mergyiste, Bamut, Achkhoy-Martan, Shaami-Yurt.

References

Bibliography 
 
 

Rivers of Ingushetia
Rivers of Chechnya